The  is a handheld game console by Nintendo. It was released on September 20, 2019, as a lower-cost, handheld-only version of the Nintendo Switch. It plays most of the same games as the original Switch and comes in several colors.

History

Background
According to The Wall Street Journal, Nintendo's goal with the Switch Lite was to produce a sub  unit, aimed at casual gamers, to compete with gaming services that do not require a dedicated device. To achieve this, Nintendo negotiated on reduced prices from its component suppliers. Further, the Journal stated that Nintendo had gained Murata Manufacturing as a battery supplier in addition to TDK, to lower costs by causing competition between the two companies.

The Switch Lite is a single, handheld-only unit, integrating buttons and control sticks into the main unit's hardware instead of Joy-Con controllers, and uses a smaller  screen. Because of the integrated controls, the Switch Lite is generally limited to games that can be played in handheld mode; while most games in the Nintendo Switch's library are compatible, some games, such as 1-2-Switch, require separate Joy-Con to be connected in order to be played.

Release
It launched with three colors: yellow, grey, and turquoise. The system was promoted alongside The Legend of Zelda: Link's Awakening, a remake of the 1993 Game Boy game. A special Pokémon Sword and Pokémon Shield branded version of the Switch Lite, themed around the Pokémon Zacian and Zamazenta, launched on November 8, 2019, a week before the game's release. A coral color was released on March 20, 2020 in Japan, and on April 3 in the rest of the world. A blue color released on May 7, 2021 in Europe, and on May 21 in the rest of the world. A special Pokémon Dialga and Palkia limited edition was released on November 5, 2021, 14 days before the release of Pokémon Brilliant Diamond and Shining Pearl. This special edition pays homage to the Nintendo DS Lite Dialga and Palkia edition.

Hardware
The Switch Lite is a single, self-contained unit, integrating the various inputs and some features of the Joy-Con controller as part of the main unit's hardware. A regular directional pad replaces the four directional buttons on the left side of the unit. The battery also has a slightly lower capacity, at 13.6 Wh/3570 mAh compared to the Switch's 16 Wh/4310 mAh. Despite the smaller battery, the unit has a longer expected playtime per charge compared to the original Switch model, estimated to last for 3–7 hours of gameplay compared to the 2.5–6.5 hours for the original Switch. This is due to the smaller screen size, the new die-shrunk 16 nm Tegra SoC and LPDDR4X being used in place of the 20 nm Tegra and LPDDR4, and the removal of certain power-consuming features such as HD Rumble and the IR camera that are included on regular Joy-Con controllers.

Limitations
The Switch Lite normally only supports games that can be played in handheld mode, retaining features like the Switch's gyroscopic sensors, Bluetooth, Wi-Fi, and NFC compatibility. Some tabletop games that require the HD Rumble or IR camera features, such as 1-2-Switch, require players to use separate Joy-Con controllers with the Switch Lite. The system does not support any docking or connectivity to a television and is thus incompatible with games that require television mode. Players who attempt to purchase games that require television or tabletop mode via the eShop on the Switch Lite will be notified of the incompatibility. Though not included with the system, the Switch Lite does support external controllers otherwise compatible with standard Switch models, such as standalone Joy-Con controllers, though they cannot be docked to the system. Some controllers, such as GameCube controllers, work with the system, but require extra adapters, as the normal GameCube to Switch adapter uses the USB ports on the full-size Switch's dock.

Reception
The Verge rated the Nintendo Switch Lite 8 out of 10 points, praising its improved battery life over the standard Nintendo Switch, as well as the design and the D-pad,  but criticizing the lack of a TV mode and the fact that some games are not compatible with the base model alone. PC Magazine criticized the components used in the Switch Lite for their quality because just like the Joy-Con of the original Nintendo Switch, the analog sticks of the console are also susceptible to drifting.

Sales
The Switch Lite had sold about 1.95 million units worldwide by September 30, 2019, only 10 days after its launch. , the Nintendo Switch Lite had sold 13.53 million units worldwide. By March 31, 2022, sales reached 18.40 million units.

Nintendo's president, Shuntaro Furukawa, said in the company's Q4 fiscal earnings report, ending December 21, 2019, that about 30% of the sales of the Switch Lite were from existing owners of the full-size Switch console, making the Lite a backup console for them. Furukawa also said that, for those purchasing their first Switch console, there was a higher percentage of women consumers that purchased the Lite compared to the full-size Switch console, and that Nintendo would increase production of the Lite for that market.

Notes

References

External links
 Official website

2010s toys
2020s toys
2019 in video gaming
ARM-based video game consoles
Computer-related introductions in 2019
Eighth-generation video game consoles
Handheld game consoles
Nintendo consoles
Nintendo Switch
Products introduced in 2019
Regionless game consoles